C. Lynn Bechler is a U.S. politician and a Republican member of the Kentucky House of Representatives representing District 4 since January 8, 2013.

Education
Bechler earned his BS in aerospace engineering from Saint Louis University.

Elections
2010: To challenge incumbent Representative Cherry, Bechler was unopposed for the May 18, 2010, Republican Primary, but lost the November 2, 2010, General election to Representative Cherry.
2012: When District 4 Democratic Representative Mike Cherry left the Legislature and left the seat open, Bechler was unopposed for the May 22, 2012, Republican Primary and won the November 6, 2012, General election with 10,114 votes (56.9%) against Democratic nominee Raymond Giannini.

References

External links
Official page at the Kentucky General Assembly
Campaign site

Lynn Bechler at Ballotpedia
C. Lynn Bechler at OpenSecrets

Place of birth missing (living people)
Year of birth missing (living people)
Living people
Republican Party members of the Kentucky House of Representatives
People from Marion, Kentucky
Saint Louis University alumni
21st-century American politicians